Pentti Taskinen (26 May 1929 – 18 December 1973) was a Finnish biathlete. He competed in the 20 km individual event at the 1960 Winter Olympics.

References

External links
 

1929 births
1973 deaths
Finnish male biathletes
Olympic biathletes of Finland
Biathletes at the 1960 Winter Olympics
People from Kuopio
Sportspeople from North Savo